Denys Vitaliovych Dubrov (10 January 1989 – 9 May 2022) was a Ukrainian swimmer. A member of the able-bodied Ukrainian National team, he competed in Paralympic S10 and SM10 (individual medley) events. At the 2016 Rio Paralympics he won three gold, three silver and two bronze medals, setting world records in the Men's SM10 200 m individual medley  and S10 100m butterfly events. , he still held the able-bodied Ukrainian National Record in the 200 m individual medley, a time of 2:00.53 which he set in 2009.

Career history
Dubrov began swimming as a youth and by 2001 was being coached by Svitlana Toloknyanyk at the Invasport club in his home town of  Dnipropetrovsk. He won a bronze medal in the 200 m individual medley at the 2006 FINA Youth World Swimming Championships and represented Ukraine at the 2009 World Aquatics Championships, competing in the heats of the 100 m butterfly, 200 m butterfly, 200 m individual medley and 4 × 100 m medley relay.

Dubrov came to international attention when he competed at the 2014 IPC Swimming European Championships in Eindhoven, where he won three medals, including gold in the SM10 200m individual medley.

The following year Dubrov represented Ukraine again, this time at the 2015 IPC Swimming World Championships in Glasgow. There he entered five events, winning medals in three. He took a bronze as part of the 4 × 100 m medley relay and won individual gold in both the 100 m butterfly and 200 m medley. As well as becoming world champion in two events, he broke the European record in both, with times of 56.43 in the butterfly and 2:11.94 in the individual medley.

Awards
Dubrow was awarded the Order for Merits (third grade) in Ukraine, after his success at the Paralympic Games in Rio de Janeiro. He was named Honoured Master of Sport in Ukraine in 2020.

References

1989 births
2022 deaths
Ukrainian male medley swimmers
Ukrainian male butterfly swimmers
Paralympic swimmers of Ukraine
S10-classified Paralympic swimmers
Paralympic gold medalists for Ukraine
Paralympic silver medalists for Ukraine
Paralympic bronze medalists for Ukraine
Swimmers at the 2016 Summer Paralympics
Swimmers at the 2020 Summer Paralympics
Medalists at the 2016 Summer Paralympics
Medalists at the 2020 Summer Paralympics
Medalists at the World Para Swimming Championships
Medalists at the World Para Swimming European Championships
Paralympic medalists in swimming
Sportspeople from Dnipro
21st-century Ukrainian people